Dirk Coster (5 October 1889 – 12 February 1950) was a Dutch physicist. He was a professor of Physics and Meteorology at the University of Groningen.

Coster was born in Amsterdam. On 26 February 1919 he married Lina Maria "Miep" Wijsman, who held a degree in Oriental languages.  Eventually, she was one of the first women to obtain a doctorate degree in this field from the University of Leiden.  Dirk and Miep had two sons and two daughters (Hendrik, Ada, Els, and Herman).  Coster is known as the co-discoverer of hafnium (element 72) in 1923, along with George de Hevesy, by means of X-ray spectroscopic analysis of zirconium ore. The discovery took place in Copenhagen, Denmark. Its name is derived from Hafnia, the Latin name for Copenhagen.

Childhood and education
Coster grew up in Amsterdam in a large working-class family; he was the third child of Barend Coster, a blacksmith, and Aafje van der Mik. The Coster family valued education.  Ten of their children survived to adulthood and all received enough education to go onto middle-class professions.  From 1904 to 1908 Dirk went to the Teacher's College in Haarlem, then was a teacher until 1913. With the aid of private support he was able to study mathematics and physics at the University of Leiden, first having passed the exams required for students who had no gymnasium education. In Leiden he was influenced by the inspiring lectures of Paul Ehrenfest, and in 1916 he obtained his M.Sc. degree. From 1916 to 1920 Coster was assistant of Lodewijk Siertsema and Wander de Haas at the Delft University of Technology, where in 1919 he obtained an Engineer's degree in electrical engineering. In 1920 and 1921 he did research at Lund University under Manne Siegbahn, on X-ray spectroscopy of different elements. Coster's thesis was on this subject, and he obtained his Ph.D. degree in 1922 in Leiden under Paul Ehrenfest; his thesis was entitled "Röntgenspectra en de atoomtheorie van Bohr" (X-ray spectra and Bohr's atomic theory).

Academic career
From August 1922 until the summer of 1923, Coster worked in Niels Bohr's Institute in Copenhagen. Within a few months he co-authored a landmark publication with Bohr, on X-ray spectroscopy and the periodic system of the elements. In addition he worked with chemist George de Hevesy on the identification of element No. 72.  Element 72 had been known to be a gap in the sequence of elements since 1914, when Henry Moseley created an experimental technique for placing the elements in a definite sequence. Radiochemist Fritz Paneth suggested that element 72 might be found in ores of zirconium. (Some histories incorrectly attribute this suggestion to physicist Niels Bohr.) Bohr published a prediction of the electronic configuration of element 72 in 1923. von Hevesy had been working with Bohr at the time.

After Coster returned from Copenhagen he became Hendrik Lorentz' assistant at the Teylers Museum in Haarlem, where he developed an X-ray spectrometer. In 1924 he was appointed at the University of Groningen, where he was the successor of Wander de Haas. At Groningen he started an active research program in X-ray spectroscopy.

In 1934 Coster became member of the Royal Netherlands Academy of Arts and Sciences.

Later years
Coster was politically involved. In 1938 he traveled to Berlin to convince Lise Meitner that she had to leave Germany to escape the persecution of the Jews. Together they went by train to Groningen; at the Dutch border, Coster persuaded German immigration officers that she had permission to travel to the Netherlands.  From there she went on to Sweden by way of Copenhagen. During the German occupation of Holland, Coster also helped Jews hide from the Nazis and listened to the BBC on a daily basis using a bicycle-powered radio.  He died in Groningen. The asteroid 10445 Coster is named after Dirk Coster.

Publications

See also
 Hafnium
 Coster–Kronig transition
 X-ray spectroscopy
 Auger effect

References and further reading

 
 
 Heisenberg's War: The Secret History of the German Bomb by Thomas Powers (Da Capo Press, 2000 ) .
 No Time to Be Brief: A Scientific Biography of Wolfgang Pauli by Charles P. Enz (Oxford University Press, 2002) .

External links
 
 H. Brinkman, Coster, Dirk (1889-1950), in Biografisch Woordenboek van Nederland.
 History of Hafnium
 Chemical & Engineering News article on the history of Hafnium by Eric R. Scerri
 Hafnium and Radioactive Tracers

1889 births
1950 deaths
20th-century Dutch physicists
Delft University of Technology alumni
Academic staff of the Delft University of Technology
Discoverers of chemical elements
Hafnium
Leiden University alumni
Members of the Royal Netherlands Academy of Arts and Sciences
Scientists from Amsterdam
Academic staff of the University of Groningen